Fritziana is a genus of frogs in the family Hemiphractidae. They are endemic to southeastern Brazil and found on the mountains and adjacent coastal lowlands from Espírito Santo to São Paulo state.

Taxonomy
The genus has been considered synonym of Flectonotus, but was recognized again in 2011. The former Flectonotus consisted of two geographically disjunctive components, one from northern South America (Flectonotus as understood today) and the other from southeastern Brazil (Fritziana). The distinctiveness of these taxa is now well established and based on both molecular, behavioural, and morphological characters.

Species

The following species are recognised in the genus Fritziana:

References

 
Hemiphractidae
Amphibian genera
Amphibians of South America
Endemic fauna of Brazil
Taxa named by Cândido Firmino de Mello-Leitão